Agino Selo is a village in the municipality of Kumanovo, North Macedonia.

Demographics
On the 1927 ethnic map of Leonhard Schulze-Jena, the village shown as a  Turkish village. According to the 2002 census, the village had a total of 965 inhabitants. Ethnic groups in the village include:

Macedonians 954
Serbs 10
Others 1

References

External links

Villages in Kumanovo Municipality